Chief Daddy 2: Going for Broke is a 2022 Nigeria Comedy movie that was released as a continuation of Chief Daddy 1. Written by Bode Asiyanbi, Hiedi Uys, Salah Sabiti, Mo Abudu, produced by EbonyLife and  directed by an award-winning director, Niyi Akinmolayan. The film stars Shaffy Bello, Funke Akindele-Bello, Joke Silva, Rahama Sadau, Mawuli Gavor, Beverly Naya, Falz and others  However, upon the release of the film, it met high criticism from the viewers from failing to meet their expectations. Therefore, the CEO of EbonyLife, MO Abudu, apologized to the viewers and promised to take note of their corrections.

Cast 
Shaffy Bello, Funke Akindele-Bello, Joke Silva, Kate Henshaw-Nuttal, Rahama Sadau, Mawuli Gavor, Beverly Naya, Falz, Linda Ejiofor Beverly Osu, Broda Shaggi, Uzor Arukwe, Zainab Balogun, Dakore Egbuson-Akande, Rachel Oniga, Chigul and Nedu Wazobia

References 

2022 films
Nigerian comedy films
Nigerian sequel films
2020s English-language films
English-language Nigerian films